Per Terje Markussen (born 1 April 1959) is a retired Norwegian football striker.

He spent his entire career in Mjøndalen, starting in 1977. He retired after Mjøndalen's relegation from the 1992 Eliteserien, but made a comeback in the 1994 1. divisjon. After Mjøndalen dropped yet another tier, he retired. Markussen also represented Norway as an U21 and senior international. He was also capped in bandy.

References

1959 births
Living people
Norwegian footballers
Mjøndalen IF players
Norway under-21 international footballers
Norway international footballers
Association football forwards
Norwegian bandy players
20th-century Norwegian people